Show of hands may refer to:

Show of hands (politics), a voting method in deliberative assemblies

Music
Show of Hands, a British folk music duo
Show of Hands (1987 album) or the title song, by Show of Hands
Show of Hands Live, a 1992 album by Show of Hands
A Show of Hands, a 1989 album by Rush
A Show of Hands (Victor Wooten album) or the title song, 1996
"Show of Hands", a 2017 song by Kaskade from Redux EP 002

Film and television
Show of Hands (film), a 2008 New Zealand film
A Show of Hands (video), a 1989 concert film by Rush
A Show of Hands (TV series), a 1992 series of short films aired on Nickelodeon